1 News (stylised as 1News) is the news division of New Zealand television network TVNZ. The service is broadcast live from TVNZ Centre in Auckland. The flagship news bulletin is the nightly 6 pm news hour, but 1 News also has midday and late night news bulletins, as well as current affairs shows such as Breakfast and Seven Sharp.

The 6 pm programme is New Zealand's most-watched news programme. As of July 2008, it has a market share of 44% (651,400+ each night).

TVNZ's Executive Editor, News and Current Affairs (formerly known as Head of News and Current Affairs) is Phil O'Sullivan. O'Sullivan had previously been in the role in an acting capacity since June 2022. His predecessors include John Gillespie who departed TVNZ in 2020, and Paul Yurisich who was appointed to the role of Head of News and Current Affairs until he resigned from TVNZ in 2022 after a review into the hiring of former Al Jazeera presenter Kamahl Santamaria.

1 News was awarded Best News in the Qantas Media Awards from 2008 through 2011 and won Best Breaking News in the New Zealand Film and Television Awards 2012.

History

Television news in New Zealand started in 1960 with the introduction of television. These bulletins were broadcast from New Zealand's four main cities (Auckland, Wellington, Christchurch and Dunedin) operating independently of each other due to technical constraints. The Wahine disaster in April 1968 highlighted the need for a nationwide news network; footage shot in Wellington could not be broadcast in other centres around the country at the same time, and the extra-tropical cyclone which contributed to the disaster also grounded air traffic preventing the film being flown to other centres.

In October 1969 the nationwide TV network was completed. The first network news broadcast was live on 3 November 1969 at 7:35 pm, read by Dougal Stevenson. This bulletin was possible due to microwave links being established between the four main centres; the programme was called the NZBC Network News. Initially, it was read by Philip Sherry, Dougal Stevenson or Bill Toft on a rotating roster.

Prior to the building of the Warkworth satellite communications station in 1971, international programmes could not be received live – the footage had to be flown into New Zealand and was often days old.

The NZBC Network News featured many other newsreaders until the NZBC was dissolved in 1975. The programme was then renamed as simply News.

TV One and TV2/South Pacific Television (SPTV) era (1975-80)
TV One began broadcasting on 1 April 1975 and moved its evening news bulletin to 6:30 pm, with Dougal Stevenson or Bill McCarthy reading the news on a rotating roster until 15 February 1980.

TV2 followed suit on 30 June 1975 and its main evening news was initially broadcast at 7 pm before moving to the earlier timeslot of 6 pm by the end of 1975. Jennie Goodwin was the first female newsreader in New Zealand to anchor a nightly television news programme, although Angela D'Audney was the first two years earlier. TV2 was rebranded as South Pacific Television in December 1976 to distinguish itself from the former NZBC channel and within the next year, its main evening news was read by Tom Bradley and Philip Sherry (later replaced by John Hawkesby) until South Pacific Television ceased transmission on 15 February 1980.

TVNZ era (1980-present)
TV One and South Pacific Television were amalgamated into Television New Zealand on 16 February 1980 and its main evening news continued to broadcast at 6:30 pm on TV One. From 31 March 1980, four regional news programmes were broadcast – one in each of the four main regions: Top Half (Auckland and the upper North Island), Today Tonight (Wellington and the lower North Island and originally the upper South Island), The Mainland Touch (Christchurch, Canterbury and later the upper South Island) and 7:30 South (Dunedin, Otago and Southland). Initially, these programmes aired at 7:30 pm and ran for half an hour in duration.

In February 1982, the main bulletin was revamped and broadcast from 6:30-7:30 pm; the one-hour package incorporated the day's national and international news, regional news programmes and the weather forecast. At the same time, Dunedin's 7:30 South was rebranded as The South Tonight and TVNZ introduced a feature segment called Nationwide; it contained regional items of national interest, as well as "sidebars" – items which, for example, focused on the human interest element of an event outlined in the network news.

In late 1983, Nationwide was dropped, with the main bulletin extended to fill the time and give greater sports news coverage.

During the mid-1980s, Philip Sherry and Tom Bradley shared the role of newsreader on a rotating roster with Richard Long and Tony Ciprian alternately presenting sports news. Weather was presented on alternate nights by Veronica Allum and Sue Scott.

The main bulletin was revamped in November 1986 and renamed as the Network News, with Judy Bailey and Neil Billington initially co-presenting in a double-headed format and replacing Philip Sherry. Tom Bradley moved to weekends, where he alternated with Angela D'Audney as weekend anchor.

In February 1988, sports anchor Richard Long took over from Neil Billington as co-anchor of the Network News, the beginning of a partnership that would continue for much of the next 15 years. Tony Ciprian moved to the new commercial network TV3, the network's first sports producer. He was with 3 News for almost 20 years.

In July 1988, the Network News was moved to 6 pm and renamed as the Network News at Six but the weekend bulletin remained at 6:30 pm (as the Network News and Sport). The moving of the Network News to 6 pm also marked the introduction of computer-generated weather graphics and the arrival of Jim Hickey and Penelope Barr, who replaced Veronica Allum and Sue Scott as weather presenters.

On 3 April 1989 TVNZ launched a new nightly current affairs programme, Holmes, which was presented by Paul Holmes. Holmes began screening at 6:30 pm. At the same time, the duration of the Network News at Six was reduced back to 30 minutes and the regional news programmes were transferred to around 5:45 pm on TV2. The year saw the introduction of TVNZ's first foreign correspondents – Liam Jeory in London and Susan Wood in Sydney.

In October 1989, the weekend Network News and Sport was moved from 6:30 pm to 6 pm.

In November 1989, the Network News was relaunched as One Network News; its renaming due to competition from new broadcasting station TV3's news programme 3 National News.

In December 1989, both Top Half and Today Tonight were axed by TVNZ but The Mainland Touch and The South Tonight continued for another year and screened on TV One at 5:45 pm as a lead-in to One Network News at 6 pm, with support from NZ On Air. The Christchurch and Dunedin based regional news programmes were axed at the end of 1990.

In February 1995, the main bulletin was again extended from 30 minutes to a full hour, screening from the now familiar 6 pm timeslot, followed by Holmes at 7 pm. The change coincided with the unveiling of a new studio set which was used until 2003. On 2 January 1995, the main One Network News bulletin was delayed for 10 minutes after protesters occupied the studio and protested about the Māori language bulletin Te Karere which was off air over the Christmas and New Year period.

July 1997 saw the replacement of weekend news presenters Angela D'Audney and Tom Bradley with husband and wife Simon Dallow and Alison Mau. Bradley resigned, but D'Audney stayed as a backup presenter for other bulletins until her death in 2002.

On 11 August 1997, the early morning Telstra Business and Breakfast shows were first aired; Telstra Business was hosted by Michael Wilson; Breakfast hosted by Susan Wood and Mike Hosking.

In 1998, TVNZ signed 3 National News anchor John Hawkesby to replace Richard Long from the start of 1999. But when Haweskby began presenting One Network News at 6 pm alongside Judy Bailey, there was a public outcry over the separation of Bailey and Long, that lead to Long reinstated as co-anchor at 6 pm three weeks later. Hawkesby later took TVNZ to court, a dispute that he subsequently won.

The programme was renamed again on 31 December 1999 to One News.

2003 saw a major shake up of TVNZ's news and current affairs programming with entering head Bill Ralston making sweeping changes to the formats of many programmes. A new state-of-the-art studio came into use for One News programmes, but many presenters were culled. The changes saw the end of Long and Bailey's 15-year partnership; from January 2004, the main 6 pm bulletin reverted to a single-headed broadcast with Judy Bailey as anchor. Jim Hickey, TVNZ's most popular weather presenter, and sports presenter April Bruce (née Ieremia) also left in 2003. Hickey returned to One News in 2007.

Close Up was launched in November 2004, when Paul Holmes, host of the Holmes programme, resigned following failed contract negotiations. Close Up followed the same format as Holmes, but was hosted by Susan Wood until her sudden resignation in 2006. Mark Sainsbury became the main host following her resignation.

In October 2005, TVNZ announced that it would not be renewing long-standing flagship broadcaster Judy Bailey's contract; some observers believe this was a direct reaction to the programme's market share decline in Auckland to 3 News. An emotional Bailey signed off for the final time at the end of the 6 pm One News bulletin on 23 December 2005. She was TVNZ's longest serving newsreader and had been reporting and presenting with both NZBC and TVNZ for 34 years. When the 6 pm edition of One News returned after the Christmas break of 2005–2006, it reverted to double-headed presentation with Wendy Petrie and Simon Dallow taking over from Bailey. The weekend 6 pm bulletin remained single-headed until September 2008, when popular presenter Peter Williams joined Bernadine Oliver-Kerby as co-anchor.

Sir Paul Holmes returned to TVNZ as the host on the new political programme Q+A in 2009. He hosted the programme until late 2012, when illness prevented him from continuing his duties. He died on 1 February 2013.

TVNZ celebrated One News' 40th birthday on 3 November 2009 with some archival footage available on their website. Later that year, Jennie Goodwin, David Beatson, Dougal Stevenson and Lindsay Perigo returned to read one Breakfast news segment each.

A Saturday edition of Breakfast, called Saturday Breakfast, was broadcast from 3 September 2011, hosted by Rawdon Christie and Toni Street, and ran until the end of 2012, when it and One News at 4:30 were cancelled for financial reasons.

In September 2012 an announcement was made that TVNZ would discontinue Close Up at the end of 2012. The final Close Up programme screened on 30 November 2012 and in early 2013, an announcement was made of the replacement show, named Seven Sharp. The first show screened on 4 February 2013.

1 News has reporters and correspondents based around New Zealand and internationally, with bureaus in Australia, Europe, USA, and in the Pacific.

Former BBC meteorologist Daniel Corbett joined the weather team in September 2014. In December 2014, Jim Hickey left his position as head weather forecaster. Nearly a year later Karen Olsen left the weathercaster position, making her final broadcast on 16 November 2015.

The programme was renamed 1 News in 2016, when TV One was renamed TVNZ 1.

During the COVID-19 pandemic in New Zealand as part of cost-cutting measures, 1 News reverted to a single news presenter for its 6pm bulletin. Simon Dallow remained as the sole newsreader while Wendy Petrie lost her role. Petrie would remain at TVNZ as a backup presenter across other 1 News programmes.

In late 2021, the organisation changed its formatting from "1 News" to "1News".

News bulletins

Breakfast 

Breakfast airs short news, sports and weather updates every half-hour, from 6 am until 8:30 am, hosted by Chris Chang (from 2023). Prior to January 2022, the weather was presented by Matty McLean.

1 News at Midday
1 News at Midday is a half-hour long bulletin that airs at midday each weekday, and is hosted by Chris Chang from Monday to Thursday and by Indira Stewart on Fridays. It airs every weekday at 12:00pm on TVNZ 1 and competed with Three's Newshub Midday until Newshub discontinued its midday bulletin in July 2016, making 1 News at Midday the only midday television news bulletin in New Zealand. Newshub reintroduced its midday bulletin in February 2021, although it is styled as Newshub Live at 11:30am and aired 30 minutes earlier than 1 News at Midday.

1 News at Six
1 News at Six is 1 News flagship hour-long bulletin, airing nightly at 6 pm; it is hosted by Simon Dallow on weekdays and Melissa Stokes at weekends. Sport is presented by Hayley Holt or Andrew Saville, and weather by Daniel Corbett or Renee Wright.

The bulletin usually commences with national and international news stories for the first 40 minutes, followed by sports news for around 15 minutes. At the conclusion of the bulletin, weather is presented.

1 News Tonight
1 News Tonight is a half-hour long bulletin that airs at approximately 10:30 pm on TVNZ 1 each weeknight, and is usually hosted by Daniel Faitaua. It competes with Three's Newshub Late.

Current affairs programmes

Seven Sharp

Seven Sharp is a half-hour current affairs programme which airs at 7 pm each weekday. Presented by Hilary Barry and Jeremy Wells, it features mostly current event or local human interest stories. It was launched in 2013, replacing Close Up and long serving broadcaster Mark Sainsbury.

Te Karere

Te Karere is a half-hour news programme broadcast at 4 pm weekdays entirely in Māori. It is presented by Scotty Morrison. The weather is also broadcast in Māori. Te Karere regularly attracts between 50,000 – 80,000 viewers a day.

Q+A

Q+A is an hour-long political show that airs at 9 am on Sundays. Presented by Jack Tame, it consists of an interview with a politician that has been in the news during the previous week and a panel debate on a political hot topic. Q+A has been screening since March 2009, originally on Sunday mornings; since July 2018, it has been broadcast in primetime. By mid-2020, it returned to its traditional Sunday morning timeslot.

Q+A won Best News/Current Affairs Programme in the 2009 Qantas Media Awards.

20/20

20/20 is an investigative news and current affairs magazine style show presented by Carolyn Robinson. The show has a similar format to that of its US namesake. It airs on TVNZ 1 and consists of both local content and international stories (often produced by partner networks, such as ABC). 20/20s set is the shared TVNZ News and Current Affairs studio in the TVNZ Television Centre in central Auckland.

Discontinued

TVNZ News at 8 and TVNZ News Now

Discontinued in July 2012, when TVNZ 7 closed down.

Business
Amalgamated into Breakfast in 2013.

Close Up

Replaced with Seven Sharp in 2013.

One News at 4.30 pm
Discontinued in November 2012 due to lack of funding.

Saturday Breakfast

Discontinued in November 2012.

1 News Special
1 News Special episodes are often aired during international, one-off and breaking news events. For international breaking news stories, 1 News often airs a video feed from other news organisations. 1 News has aired specials for the following events:

During the COVID-19 pandemic in New Zealand a 1 News Special was broadcast most days at 1pm. During the 1pm broadcast Director-General of Health Ashley Bloomfield would announce how many new cases of coronavirus were in New Zealand.

Annual specials
Annual specials are aired for the following events:
 Annual Government Budget announcements.
 Annual special reports such as The Year in Review (which airs on the first Sunday of the year and looks at the previous year).
 Annual New Year fireworks in Auckland.

Presenters

1 News at Midday

1 News at Six

Weekdays

Weekends

1 News Tonight

Backup presenters

Reporters
The following is a list of 1 News reporters.

This list does not include reporters from 20/20, Q+A, Fair Go, Sunday, Te Karere, Marae, Breakfast and Seven Sharp.
TVNZ has one of the largest news gathering teams in the country - based in New Zealand and in TVNZ bureaus around the world.

Developers
Reef

News resources on 1 News
 ABC News
 ABC News (Australia)
 BBC News
 Nine News

See also
 List of New Zealand television personalities

References

External links
 

1960s New Zealand television series debuts
1960s New Zealand television series
1970s New Zealand television series
1980s New Zealand television series
1990s New Zealand television series
2000s New Zealand television series
2010s New Zealand television series
2020s New Zealand television series
New Zealand television news shows
TVNZ 1 original programming